Carrington College is a network of for-profit private colleges with its headquarters in Sacramento, California and 17 locations throughout the Western United States. Established in 1967, it has a student enrollment of over 5,200 and 132,000 alumni.

Carrington College offers career training in the medical, dental, veterinary, criminal justice, and industrial trade fields. The company is owned by San Joaquin Valley College, Inc.

History
The institution was founded in 1967 in Sacramento, California, as the Northwest College of Medical Assistants and Dental Assistants. The college was established to meet the education needs of the local healthcare community.

In 1969, the college was purchased and underwent its first name change, to Western College of Allied Health Careers – A Bryman School". The Education Corporation of America ("EdCOA, Inc.") purchased the college in 1983 and changed its name to Western Career College (WCC). In 1986, WCC opened a second campus in the Bayfair Center in San Leandro, California. The third campus opened in 1997 in Pleasant Hill, California.

WCC earned regional accreditation by the Accrediting Commission for Community and Junior Colleges of the Western Association of Schools and Colleges in June 2001.

In December 2003, U.S. Education Corporation, a California-based company, acquired Western Career College. The U.S. Education Corporation also acquired Apollo College, which was founded by Margaret M Carlson in 1975 in Phoenix, Arizona, to prepare graduates for careers in skilled professions. The U.S. Education Corporation was led by president and chief executive officer George Montgomery from 2002 to 2011. The college expanded in August 2005 by incorporating the operations and programs of Silicon Valley College (SVC).

In September 2008, U.S. Education Corporation became a division of DeVry, Inc. In 2010, Western Career College changed its name to Carrington College California and Apollo College changed its name to Carrington College.  The name Carrington College was chosen after a year of extensive research and testing with current and potential students, and staff focus groups. "The fact that the name contains the word 'caring' connotes the care and dedication faculty and staff take to help students achieve their career goals and aspirations," said George Montgomery, president of U.S. Education, the parent organization for both colleges. "It also coincides with the schools’ emphasis on health care programs."

Montgomery retired at the end of 2011 and was succeeded as president of the group by Robert Paul, DeVry University's vice president for metro operations. In 2012, under Paul's leadership, the institution's mascots, Blue and Goldie, were developed. In 2014, Paul succeeded David Pauldine as president of DeVry University and was succeeded as president of Carrington College Group by Jeff Akens. Previously, Akens had served as president of Carrington College California from 2007 to 2014 and had been with the institution since 1993. In 2016, Donna M. Lorraine was appointed president of Carrington College, after Akens' retirement.

In 2014, Carrington College California received approval under the ACCJC/WASC accreditation to add the Carrington College campuses to its existing network, resulting in one consolidated institution called Carrington College.

In December 2018, Carrington College was sold by Adtalem Global Education group (formerly the DeVry Education Group) to San Joaquin Valley College, Inc.

Carrington's Trades Education Center was introduced in 2020 in Phoenix, AZ.

Academics
Carrington College campuses offer programs that lead to a Certificate of Achievement or Associate of Science Degree. Carrington College provides employment-focused, outcome-based, postsecondary education and training with a focus in the healthcare industry, in areas including medical, dental, administrative, veterinary and health studies programs.

Curriculum
Carrington College offers 26 programs through five areas of focus including medicine, health studies, dentistry, administration, or veterinary medicine. Some of the programs include health care administration, pharmacy technology, practical nursing, criminal justice: corrections, veterinary assisting, and dental assisting.

Accreditation
Carrington College is regionally accredited by the Accrediting Commission for Community and Junior Colleges. Additionally, many of the programs at Carrington College are accredited by specialized accrediting bodies, which focus on specific occupational fields such as the Commission on Accreditation of Allied Health Education Programs (CAAHEP), the American Society of Health System Pharmacists, and the American Veterinary Medical Association.

Campuses and centers
Carrington College is based in Sacramento, California. The college has 17 campuses and centers in seven states including California, Arizona, Idaho, New Mexico, Nevada, Oregon, and Washington.

Carrington College campuses and center locations include:
Glendale, Arizona
Mesa, Arizona
Phoenix, Arizona 
Tucson, Arizona
Citrus Heights, California
Pleasant Hill, California
Sacramento, California
San Jose, California (including North San Jose)
San Leandro, California
Stockton, California
Boise, Idaho
Albuquerque, New Mexico
Las Vegas, Nevada
Reno, Nevada
Portland, Oregon
Spokane Valley, Washington

References

External links
 

Private universities and colleges in Arizona
For-profit universities and colleges in the United States
Educational institutions established in 1967
1967 establishments in Arizona